Adesmia resinosa is a species of flowering plant in the legume family, Fabaceae. It belongs to the subfamily Faboideae. The species is found in portions of South America, with an example location being La Campana National Park in central Chile as an understory associate of the Chilean wine palm.

See also
 Adesmia balsamica

Line notes

References
 C. Michael Hogan. 2008. Chilean Wine Palm: Jubaea chilensis, GlobalTwitcher.com, ed. N. Stromberg
 Ferdinand von Mueller. 1891. Select extra-tropical plants: readily eligible for industrial culture, page 19 of 594 pages

resinosa
Flora of Chile